Yan Liming (15 April 1963 – 22 September 2018), better known as Dawn Gan, was a Singaporean xinyao singer. She was one of the pioneer xinyao singers in Singapore.

Early life and education 
Gan was born on 15 April 1963 and studied at River Valley High School and National Junior College.

Career 
In 1984, Gan signed a five-year contract with Tony Wong Company as a singer, one of the first two solo xinyao recording singers.

Gan sang the theme song, Youth 1 2 3, for the 1986 Singapore Broadcasting Corporation (SBC) Channel 8's drama The Happy Trio. In September 1986, Tony Wong Company would cease its operations, and had agreed to release Gan from her 5-year contract ahead of the clause which would abrogated the contract if the company did not release a new album for her within a year from her last release. In March 1987, Gan signed with the record label, Ocean Butterflies Music.

In 1988, Gan also made her acting debut in a Channel 8 drama, Song of Youth, about aspiring singers. In the drama, she played an eponymous named undergraduate student whose personality matches her real self and writes lyrics for other. In promoting the drama, SBC held a concert which Gan also performed at. She left record label Ocean Butterflies Music and signed with recording company, WEA Records (now known as Warner Music Group). Production of her albums was still done by Ocean Butterflies Music.

From 2008, Gan had performed yearly at the annual Xinyao Reunion Concert series organised by TCR Music Station until 2018. In July 2014, she also performed at a xinyao concert held at Bras Basah Complex as part of the xinyao documentary film, The Songs We Sang.

Personal life 
Gan was married with two sons and a daughter and lived in Hong Kong with her family.

Gan was diagnosed with synovial sarcoma in 2013 and then early-stage breast cancer in 2014. She had five surgeries to remove four tumours and a lobe of her lung and were deemed tumour-free in 2016. She died on 22 September 2018 in Hong Kong.

Two concerts were held in memorial of Gan, one held at the Singapore Chinese Cultural Centre on 10 October 2018 by TCR Music Station  and another concert, Embracing Dawn – Farewell For Dawn Gan, at Capitol Theatre, on 15 October 2018 organised by Singapore Press Holdings' Chinese Media Group and local record label Ocean Butterflies Music.

Discography

Notes

References

External links 
 Dawn Gan at MusicSG (National Library Board)

1963 births
2018 deaths
20th-century Singaporean women singers
21st-century Singaporean women singers
Deaths from synovial sarcoma